NGC 704 is a lenticular galaxy located 220 million light-years away in the constellation Andromeda. The galaxy was discovered by astronomer William Herschel on September 21, 1786 and is also a member of Abell 262.

See also
 List of NGC objects (1–1000)

References

External links

704
006953
Andromeda (constellation)
Astronomical objects discovered in 1786
Lenticular galaxies
Abell 262
01343